is a female manga artist duo in Japan, made up of  and . Their group name derives from the diner hangout Peach-Pit from the TV show Beverly Hills, 90210. Although both have similar styles, with some artwork it is possible to identify which artist drew it. Both are known for their bishōjo styled works.

The two of them grew up together and went to the same elementary school and have been best friends ever since. Both started as dōjinshi manga artists, but not as Peach-Pit. Then they were scouted by Dengeki Comic Gao!. In  2008, one of their manga, Shugo Chara!, was awarded the Kodansha Manga Award for best children's manga. Shugo Chara was also turned later into an anime television series.

Critical reception 

A review of Peach Pit's work states; "What sets Shugo Chara! above other manga aimed at a younger audience is the underlying message that the mangakas incorporated. In the manga, the main characters work hard to protect other children and never give up on their dreams." This is seen as an encouragement by the authors to  "search out your potential, realize your dreams, and support the dreams of your friends is a powerful and positive topic. It can inspire people of any age, as shown in the story."

Bibliography 

  (2001)
  (2002–2005)
  (2002–2007, 2008–2014)
  (2003–2011)
  (2006–2010)
  (2009)
  (2010)
  (2011)
  (2012–2015)

References

External links
 Momo no Tane  Official Peach-Pit homepage 
 http://www.heartofmanga.com/ Shugo Chara! Peach Pit series review

 
Collective pseudonyms
Japanese female comics artists
Manga artists from Chiba Prefecture
Winner of Kodansha Manga Award (Children)
Pseudonymous women writers
21st-century pseudonymous writers